The Snell Exhibition is an annual scholarship awarded to students of the University of Glasgow to allow them to undertake postgraduate study at Balliol College, Oxford. The award was founded by the bequest of Sir John Snell in a will made in 1677, although the original stipulation referred to the University of Oxford, rather than Balliol in particular. Snell died on 6 August 1679, but wrangling over the will meant that it was nearly twenty years before the first scholarships were awarded; the first four Snell Exhibitioners were admitted to Balliol in mid-1699.

Snell had been a Royalist in the Civil War, and was later secretary to the Duke of Monmouth and had the management of his Scottish estates. He intended the bequest to be used to educate Scottish clergymen for the then-established Scottish Episcopal Church. By Adam Smith's day, the bequest was mostly regarded as an educational charity, though its exact status was not settled until later. "By the will of John Snell his exhibitors were under bond to take Anglican orders and return to Scotland, but the penalty was not enforced in the case of Adam Smith and numerous others."  (C. R. Fay, quoting The Times obituary of Smith.) Snell is buried in St Cross Church, which since 2011 has housed Balliol's Special Collections Library, being next to the college's graduate centre, Holywell Manor.

Each year, there is an annual dinner held at Balliol and attended by delegates of Balliol, Glasgow and St John's College, Cambridge, in honour of the foundation.

Notable Exhibitioners
Notable Snell Exhibitioners include:
 W. G. S. Adams: political scientist and public servant
 Hely Hutchinson Almond: headmaster of Loretto School
 Matthew Baillie: physician and pathologist
 Captain Robert Blair: soldier
 Sir Drummond Bone: Master of Balliol and former Vice-Chancellor of the University of Liverpool
 Denis Brogan: historian
 Robert Browning: Byzantinist
 Edward Caird: philosopher
 Professor Tom Campbell: legal philosopher
 John Douglas: Bishop of Salisbury
 Sir William Hamilton: metaphysician
 Andrew Lang: writer
 John Gibson Lockhart: writer
 Professor Sir Neil MacCormick: jurist and MEP
 Martin McLaughlin: FIAT-Serena Professor of Italian, Oxford
 Archibald Main: ecclesiastical historian
 J. H. Muirhead: philosopher
 John Nichol: biographer
 Herbert James Paton: philosopher
 Murray Pittock: academic
 Robert Ranken: cricketer
 John Campbell Shairp: literary critic
 Adam Smith: moral philosopher
 John Smith: Savilian Professor of Geometry, Oxford
 James Stirling: mathematician
 Richard Susskind: legal and IT adviser
 Archibald Campbell Tait: Archbishop of Canterbury
 Diane Watt: medievalist
 W. S. Watt: classicist

External links 
 The Snell Foundation Information from Balliol College
 Snell Exhibitioners Complete list of recipients, 1699–2000

Balliol College, Oxford
University of Glasgow
Scholarships in the United Kingdom
Awards and prizes of the University of Oxford
1677 establishments in Scotland
Awards established in 1677